The Dan Duquette Sports Academy is a sports training center located in Hinsdale, Massachusetts, in the United States. The academy was founded by Dan Duquette, the general manager of the Baltimore Orioles.

Overview 
The academy provides overnight and day camp with one- and two-week sessions for boys and girls ages 8 to 18.  The academy features camps for baseball, softball, basketball, soccer and football. The Sports Academy also sponsors weekend tournaments for youth baseball teams ranging in age from 9U to 19U. 

The camp uses latest technology, including digital teaching devices, enhances the training experience. 

The baseball field at the Sports Academy also served as the temporary home of the Berkshire Dukes of the New England Collegiate Baseball League in 2004 prior to the team moving to its permanent home at Pittsfield, Massachusetts' Wahconah Park.

References

External links
 Camp Website

Baseball venues in Massachusetts
New England Collegiate Baseball League ballparks
Sports in Berkshire County, Massachusetts
Sports schools in the United States
Buildings and structures in Berkshire County, Massachusetts